Bernard Cohen (born 1963) is an Australian writer, the author of five novels, a book of short stories and a children's picture book.

Career 

Cohen's first novel, Tourism, was published in 1992. The Blindman's Hat won the Australian/Vogel Literary Award in 1996. Cohen's fifth novel, The Antibiography of Robert F Menzies, won the inaugural Russell Prize for Humour Writing. Cohen's short stories have been widely anthologised, including in the Penguin Century of Australian Stories, Best Australian Stories 2002 and 2009 and Picador New Writing. His first collection of short stories, When I Saw the Animal (UQP), was published in 2018. From 1990 to 1991 he was co-editor of the literary journal Editions Review.

In 2006 Cohen founded The Writing Workshop, which runs creative writing programs for children in New South Wales, and online.

Awards 

 2015 Russell Prize for Humour Writing for The Antibiography of Robert F Menzies
 1996 The Australian / Vogel Literary Award for The Blindman's Hat
 Sydney Morning Herald Best Young Australian novelist (3 times: 1996 [for Tourism], 1997 [for The Blindman's Hat], 1998 [for Snowdome]
 2001 Arts Council England Writer's Award  
 1997 Alumnus of the Year University of Technology, Sydney
 1986 Winner, Canberra Times Short Story of the Year (under 25 year-old category).

Bibliography 
Novels
 Tourism (Picador, Sydney, 1992)
 The Blindman's Hat (Allen and Unwin, Sydney, 1997)
 Snowdome (Allen and Unwin, Sydney, 1998)
 Hardly Beach Weather (HarperCollins, Sydney, 2002)
 The Antibiography of Robert F Menzies (Fourth Estate, Sydney, 2013), winner of the Russell Prize.

Children's book
 Paul Needs Specs, illustrated by Geoff Kelly (Penguin, Melbourne, 2003; Kane/Miller, La Jolla, California 2004; Booxen, Seoul, 2011)

Other publications
 Speedfactory co-authored with John Kinsella, McKenzie Wark and Terri-ann White (Fremantle Arts Centre Press, Fremantle, 2002)
 Foreign Logics CD-ROM, collaboration with David Bickerstaff (DA2 digital arts development agency, Bristol 2001; Institute of Contemporary Art (ICA London) New Media work of the month, September 2001)
 Analects zine co-authored with Brent Clough (self-published, Sydney, 1988)
When I Saw The Animal (short story collection, 2018)

References 

1963 births
20th-century Australian novelists
20th-century Australian male writers
21st-century Australian novelists
Australian male novelists
Australian children's writers
Living people
21st-century Australian male writers